Otgonny is a rural locality (a khutor) in Eltonskoye Rural Settlement, Pallasovsky District, Volgograd Oblast, Russia. The population was 39 as of 2010. There are 2 streets.

Geography 
Otgonny is located 143 km southwest of Pallasovka (the district's administrative centre) by road. Priozerny is the nearest rural locality.

References 

Rural localities in Pallasovsky District